Porters, is a commercial ski resort just over an hour's drive (98km) west from Christchurch, in the South Island of New Zealand. Originally functioning as a club skifield, it has one beginner magic carpet, one platter tow, one chairlift and three t-bars. The difficulty of the slopes is distributed as 15% beginner, 35% intermediate and 50% advanced. Modern grooming equipment is used, and snowmaking facilities operate along the main pistes along the chairlift. 

There is one club-run lodge with 42 beds, situated along on the mountain's access road, said by the company operating the field to be "the least intimidating in Canterbury".

With poor snow fall between 1987 and 1990, Porters became the first skifield in New Zealand to install snow making in 1991.

In 2007 the name of the field changed from Porter Heights to simply Porters to reflect a change in ownership.  By 2020 it was again rebranded as Porters Alpine Resort. This has brought various improvements to the field, including a new groomer, cafe and platter lift.

In 2011 a proposed land swap attracted controversy. Blackfish, the Australian company that owns the ski field, offered to swap 70 ha of land on Banks Peninsula for 198 ha of conservation land adjacent to the ski field. Alan Morrison, the director general of the Department of Conservation, agreed to the land swap in principle. The land swap is opposed by the Canterbury Aoraki Conservation Board and by Forest and Bird. 

Porters wish to expand into the adjoining Crystal Valley, which has better snow coverage.

In 2015 Porters had plans for a $60m gondola and $100m hotel complex. These have yet to be developed. Porters wishes to grow the operation to a year round business and has plans to install zip lines, hot pools, mountain biking trails and hiking.

On Friday 22nd of July 2021, Porters had one of its biggest days ever during the July school holidays with 1200 people skiers. This was bigger that the 2020 holiday maximum of 900 skiers and also greater than the 2020 July school holiday average of 501 daily skiers.

Geography
Porters Ski Area is located at the southern end of the Craigieburn Range in the South Island of New Zealand. The Craigieburn Range is situated 85 km northwest of Christchurch and an equal distance from both the west and east coast of the South Island. The range is orientated northeast to southwest and extends for 26 km.
The geology and topography of the Craigieburn Range is typical of much of the eroded alpine land east of the Main Divide with folded indurated sandstones and siltstones forming rounded ridge tops. Many of the slopes are still very active due to numerous shatter belts within the highly jointed bedrock resulting in the predominantly scree-covered terrain. Although valley glaciations would have been extensive in the Late Pleistocene, most evidence of this has been severely modified due to fluvial erosion and talus deposition. The ski area consists of approximately 80% of this scree with the remaining cover being alpine vegetation.

Statistics

Elevation
Summit 1995 m (6545 ft) 
Base 1302 m (4272 ft)

Lifts
T-Bar 3
 Doppelmayr
 1740 m - 1955 m (5709 ft - 6414 ft); 
T-Bar 2
  Doppelmayr
 1580 m - 1780 m (5184 ft - 5840 ft); 
1 T-Bar
 1305 m - 1625 m (4281 ft - 5331 ft); 
1 Platter
 1305 m - 1340 m (4281 ft - 4396 ft); 
1 Magic carpet

Trails

Climate
There are two principal storm systems that influence Porter Ski Area. The typical storm involves the passage of a southwest frontal band. Warm, gusty west to northwest winds precede the frontal passage with a change to cooler south to southwest winds following behind. The second storm type involves a deepening depression that moves across central New Zealand to lie off the East Coast of the South Island. Such a system feeds a moist east to southeast airflow into the Craigieburn region. Prowse and McGregor suggest that the majority of seasonal snow accumulations along the Craigieburn Range are associated with typical northwest-turning southerly storm cycles, due to the proximity of the range to the Southern Alps.

Flora
187 plant species can be found within the ski field boundary.

Fauna
During the summer months five species of grasshoppers can be found within the ski field boundary. They include Sigaus villosus which can be found along the ridgelines, Brachaspis nivalis which lives on the rocky scree, Sigaus australis, Paprides nitidus which both live in the alpine tussocklands and Phaulacridium marginale which can be found in the tussocklands below 1,100 m.

References

External links

 Porters Ski Area

Ski areas and resorts in Canterbury, New Zealand